The National Collegiate Athletic Association chess tournament is held every first semester of the Philippines academic year. The eight members schools send in a four-member team in both the Seniors and Juniors Division.

The structure is a Swiss-system tournament. In the end of the tournament, the schools with the two top scores would figure in a Finals match.

Champions

Number of championships by school

Note
LSGH won its four (4) championships as a junior to DLSU.

References

Champions list at the official NCAA Philippines website
Presidents and hosts list at the official NCAA Philippines website
Philippine Chess Forum

Chess
Chess competitions